The Innocent Ones may refer to:
 The Innocent Ones (Blue Tears album)
 The Innocent Ones (Willie Nile album)